Mohammad Gharazi (also spelled Mohammad Qarazi) is an Iranian politician who served as minister of petroleum from 1981 to 1985 and minister of post from 1985 to 1997. He was also a member of the Iranian Parliament from 1980 to 1984 and also governor of Khuzestan Province. He was an independent candidate in the 2013 presidential election.

Early life and education
He was born on 12 February 1942 in Shahreza, Isfahan province. He studied electronics at the University of Tehran. He later moved to France but was back to his home country and was arrested by SAVAK in 1972.

Career
Gharazi began his political career in 1974 and was exiled to Iraq by Shah's government. In 1976, he joined the Mojahedin-e-Khalq Organization (MKO). He accompanied Ruhollah Khomeini on his trip from Paris to Tehran. Following the establishment of the Islamic republic, Gharazi was appointed governor of Kurdistan Province and later Khuzestan Province. He was elected as member of the Iranian Parliament in 1980 election. He later was appointed minister of petroleum by the then Prime Minister Mir-Hossein Mousavi, replacing Mohammad Javad Tondguyan in the post. He held this post until 1985, when he became minister of post (currently Communication). He resigned from office in 1997 after election of Mohammad Khatami. He was also a member of City Council of Tehran from 1999 to 2000.

2013 presidential campaign

Gharazi run for President of Iran as an independent in the 2013 election, having announced his candidacy on 8 May 2013. His candidacy was approved by Guardian Council. He was the only independent candidate approved to run in the presidential election. However, he was regarded as one of the dark horses in the election. He won the sixth place in the election, receiving only 446,015 votes.

Electoral history

References

Living people
1942 births
Politicians from Isfahan
Oil ministers of Iran
Government ministers of Iran
Candidates for President of Iran
Executives of Construction Party politicians
Tehran Councillors 1999–2003
Early People's Mojahedin Organization of Iran members